Haastrecht is a town on the Hollandse IJssel river in the Dutch province of South Holland. It is a part of the municipality of Krimpenerwaard, and lies about 5 km east of Gouda.

In 2001, the town of Haastrecht had 3302 inhabitants. The built-up area of the town was 0.58 km², and contained 1325 residences.
The statistical area "Haastrecht", which also can include the peripheral parts of the village, as well as the surrounding countryside, has a population of around 2330.

Haastrecht received city rights in 1396. It remained a separate municipality until 1985, when it became part of Vlist.

References

Populated places in South Holland
Former municipalities of South Holland
Krimpenerwaard